Charles Schwab may refer to:
Charles M. Schwab (1862–1939), American steel magnate of Bethlehem Steel
Charles R. Schwab (born 1937), American broker and founder of the Charles Schwab Corporation
Charles Schwab Corporation, an American multinational financial services company, stockbroker and bank

Schwab, Charles